Agassiziella is a genus of moths of the family Crambidae.

Species
Agassiziella albidivisa (Warren, 1896)
Agassiziella alicialis (Hampson, 1906)
Agassiziella angulipennis (Hampson, 1891)
Agassiziella bambesensis (Ghesquière, 1942)
Agassiziella dianale (Hampson, 1893)
Agassiziella fuscifusalis (Hampson, 1893)
Agassiziella hapilista (Swinhoe, 1892)
Agassiziella irisalis (Walker, 1859)
Agassiziella kwangtungiale (Caradja, 1925)
Agassiziella niveinotatum (Hampson, 1893)
Agassiziella picalis (Guenée, 1854)

References

 , 1999: Catalogue of the Oriental Acentropinae (Lepidoptera: Crambidae). Tijdschrift voor Entomologie 142 (1): 125–142. Full article: .
 , 1989: Microlepidoptera of Thailand 2: 169.
 
 

Acentropinae
Crambidae genera